The 15th (Scottish) Infantry Division was an infantry division of the British Army that served in the First World War. The 15th (Scottish) Division was formed from men volunteering for Kitchener's Army, and served from 1915 to 1918 on the Western Front. The division was later disbanded, after the war, in 1919.

First World War
The division was a New Army unit formed in September 1914 as part of the K2 Army Group.  The division moved to France in July 1915 and spent the duration of the First World War in action on the Western Front. The division fought in the Battle of Loos in which it seizing the village of Loos and Hill 70, the deepest penetration of the German positions by the six British divisions involved in the initial day. It later fought in the Battle of the Somme (1916) which included the battles of Pozières and Flers–Courcelette, the Battle of Arras 1917 and the Third Battle of Ypres.

The North Uist-born war poet Dòmhnall Ruadh Chorùna, a highly important figure in 20th century Scottish Gaelic literature, saw combat with the 7th (Service) Battalion King's Own Cameron Highlanders, 44th Infantry Brigade, 15th (Scottish) Division during the trench warfare along the Western Front and vividly described his war experiences in verse.

General officers commanding

The division had the following commanders:

Order of battle

See also

 List of British divisions in World War I

Footnotes

References

Further reading

External links
 The British Army in the Great War: The 15th (Scottish) Division
 Scottish Lion on Patrol: the story of 15th Scottish Reconnaissance Regiment

Infantry divisions of the British Army in World War I
Kitchener's Army divisions
Military units and formations established in 1914
1914 establishments in the United Kingdom